Pedro Ochoa (February 22, 1900 – September 5, 1947) was an Argentine football forward. At club level, he played his entire career for Racing Club, where he won 12 titles with the team.

Biography
He debuted with the Racing senior team at the age of 16, soon becoming a fan favourite due to his conditions and skills as a playmaker. 

Ochoa played his entire club career for Racing Club, where he won six league championships, 4 national cups and 2 international cups. He was nicknamed "Ochoíta" and El rey de la gambeta (The king of dribbling) due to his outstanding skills with the ball.

He was admired by Carlos Gardel, who sang the tango "Patadura" (a lunfardo word for a "two left feet man") written by José López Ares and Enrique Carrera Sotelo. The tango mentions several notable footballers of those years, such as Ochoa (referring him as Ochoíta), Manuel Seoane, Luis Monti and Domingo Tarasconi (as Tarasca).

Ochoa was part of the Argentina national team in the 1928 Olympic games, but he did not play in any matches. In 1931 he retired from football. Ochoa died at 47 years old, in Tandil, Buenos Aires Province.

Honours

Racing Club
 Primera División (6): 1916, 1917, 1918, 1919, 1921, 1925
 Copa de Honor MCBA (1): 1917
 Copa Ibarguren (3): 1916, 1917, 1918
 Copa Aldao (2): 1917, 1918

Argentina national team
 Copa América (1): 1927
 Summer Olympics (1): 1928 (Silver medal)

References

External links

Todo Racing profile

1900 births
1947 deaths
Sportspeople from Avellaneda
Argentine footballers
Argentina international footballers
Argentine people of Basque descent
Olympic footballers of Argentina
Olympic silver medalists for Argentina
Association football forwards
Argentine Primera División players
Racing Club de Avellaneda footballers
Olympic medalists in football
Medalists at the 1928 Summer Olympics
Footballers at the 1928 Summer Olympics